The Jerman House is a historic house at 24 Hampton Hills Lane in Richmond, Virginia.  It is a -story brick structure, with a side gable roof, and flanking -story wings extending to the sides at a setback.  The brick is multi-tone red brick, and is laid in Flemish bond, with dark gray glazed bricks interspersed.  The main entrance is at the center of the north-facing front, set in a segmented-arch opening.  The house was built in 1935–36 to a design by William Lawrence Bottomley, and was the last of his commissions for Richmond-area clients.

The house was listed on the National Register of Historic Places in 2016.

See also
National Register of Historic Places listings in Richmond, Virginia

References

Houses on the National Register of Historic Places in Virginia
Colonial Revival architecture in Virginia
Houses completed in 1936
National Register of Historic Places in Richmond, Virginia
Houses in Richmond, Virginia